R. Slater (full name dates of birth and death unknown) was an English cricketer.  Slater was a right-handed batsman who bowled right-arm roundarm fast.

Slater made a single first-class appearance for Lancashire in their first-class match against Middlesex at the Cattle Market Ground, Islington in 1865.  In this match, he was dismissed for a duck twice.  In Lancashire's first-innings he batted at number ten and was dismissed by Russell Walker, while in their second-innings he batted at number eleven and was dismissed by George Howitt.  Middlesex won the match by 10 wickets.  This was his only major appearance for Lancashire.

References

External links
R. Slater at ESPNcricinfo
R. Slater at CricketArchive

English cricketers
Lancashire cricketers